Prince Andrew of Greece and Denmark (– 3 December 1944) of the House of Schleswig-Holstein-Sonderburg-Glücksburg, was the seventh child and fourth son of King George I of Greece and Olga Constantinovna of Russia. He was a grandson of Christian IX of Denmark and the father of Prince Philip, Duke of Edinburgh. He was a prince of Greece and Denmark, both by virtue of his patrilineal descent.

A career soldier, Prince Andrew began military training at an early age, and was commissioned as an officer in the Greek army. His command positions were substantive appointments rather than honorary, and he saw service in the Balkan Wars. In 1913, his father was assassinated and Andrew's elder brother Constantine became king. Constantine's neutrality policy during World War I led to his abdication, and most of the royal family, including Andrew, was exiled. On their return a few years later, Andrew saw service as Major General in the Greco-Turkish War (1919–1922), but the war went badly for Greece, and Andrew was blamed, in part, for the loss of Greek territory. He was exiled for a second time in 1922, and spent most of the rest of his life in France.

By 1930, Andrew was estranged from his wife, Princess Alice of Battenberg. His only son, Prince Philip, served in the British navy during World War II, while all four of his daughters were married to Germans, three of whom had Nazi connections. Separated from his wife and son by the effects of the war, Andrew died in Monte Carlo in 1944. He had seen neither of them since 1939.

Early life
Prince Andrew was born at the Tatoi Palace just north of Athens on 2 February 1882, the fourth son of George I of Greece. A member of the House of Schleswig-Holstein-Sonderburg-Glücksburg, he was a prince of both Greece and Denmark, as his father was a younger son of Christian IX of Denmark. He was in the line of succession to the Greek and more distantly to the Danish throne.

In addition to his native Greek he learned Danish, German, French, English and Russian; In conversations with his parents he refused to speak anything but Greek. He attended cadet school and staff college at Athens, and was given additional private tuition in military subjects by Panagiotis Danglis, who recorded that he was "quick and intelligent". He "became quite friendly" with fellow student Theodore Pangalos.

Despite his near-sightedness,  Andrew joined the army as a cavalry officer in May 1901.

Marriage
In 1902, Prince Andrew met Princess Alice of Battenberg during his stay in London on the occasion of the coronation of Edward VII, who was his uncle-by-marriage and her grand-uncle. Princess Alice was a daughter of Prince Louis of Battenberg and Princess Victoria of Hesse and by Rhine, King Edward's niece. They fell in love, and the following year, on 6 October 1903, Andrew married Alice in a civil wedding at Darmstadt. The following day two religious wedding services were performed: one Lutheran in the Evangelical Castle Church, and another Greek Orthodox in the Russian Chapel on the Mathildenhöhe. Prince and Princess Andrew had five children, all of whom later had children of their own.

Early career
In 1909, the political situation in Greece led to a coup d'état, as the Athens government refused to support the Cretan parliament, which had called for the union of Crete (still nominally part of the Ottoman Empire) with the Greek mainland. A group of dissatisfied officers formed a Greek nationalist Military League and demanded, among other reforms, the removal of royal princes from the army, which led to Prince Andrew's resignation from the army and the rise to power of Eleftherios Venizelos.
A few years later, at the outbreak of the Balkan Wars in 1912, Andrew was reinstated in the army as a lieutenant colonel in the 3rd Cavalry Regiment, and placed in command of a field hospital. During the war, his father was assassinated and Andrew inherited a villa on the island of Corfu, Mon Repos. In 1914, Andrew (like many European princes) held honorary military posts in both the German and Russian empires, as well as Prussian, Russian, Danish and Italian knighthoods.

During World War I, he continued to visit Britain, despite veiled accusations in the British House of Commons that he was a German agent. His brother, King Constantine, who was the Kaiser's brother-in-law, followed a neutrality policy, but the democratically elected government of Venizelos supported the Allies. By June 1917, the King's neutrality policy had become so untenable that he abdicated and the Greek royal family were forced into exile. For the next few years, most of the Greek royal family lived in Switzerland.

Exile from Greece
For three years, Constantine's second son, Alexander, was king of Greece, until his early death from an infection due to a monkey bite. Constantine was restored to the throne, and Andrew was once again reinstated in the army, this time as a major-general. The family took up residence at Mon Repos.

Andrew was given command of the II Army Corps during the Battle of the Sakarya, which effectively stalemated the Greco-Turkish War (1919–1922). Andrew had little respect for his superior officers, whom he considered incompetent. He was ordered to attack the Turkish positions, which he considered a desperate move little short "of ill-concealed panic". Refusing to put his men in undue danger (suffering lack of food and ammunition), Andrew followed his own battle plan, much to the dismay of the commanding general, Anastasios Papoulas. Relieved of his chief of staff, and given a dressing-down by Papoulas, in September Andrew asked to be removed from command but Papoulas refused. Andrew's troops were forced to retreat. He was placed on leave for two months, until he was transferred to the Supreme Army Council. In March 1922, he was appointed as commander of the V Army Corps in Epirus and the Ionian Islands. Papoulas was replaced by General Georgios Hatzianestis.

The Greek defeat in Asia Minor in August 1922 led to the 11 September 1922 Revolution, during which Prince Andrew was arrested, court-martialed, and found guilty of "disobeying an order" and "acting on his own initiative" during the battle of the previous year. Many defendants in the treason trials that followed the coup were shot, including Hatzianestis and five senior politicians. British diplomats assumed that Andrew was also in mortal danger. Andrew, though spared, was banished for life and his family fled into exile aboard a British cruiser, HMS Calypso. The family settled at Saint-Cloud on the outskirts of Paris, in a small house loaned to them by Andrew's wealthy sister-in-law, Princess George of Greece. He and his family were stripped of their Greek nationality, and traveled under Danish passports.

In 1930, Andrew published a book entitled Towards Disaster: The Greek Army in Asia Minor in 1921, in which he defended his actions during the Battle of the Sakarya, but he essentially lived a life of enforced retirement, despite only being in his forties. During their time in exile the family became more and more dispersed. Alice suffered a nervous breakdown and was institutionalized in Switzerland. Their daughters married and settled in Germany, separated from Andrew, and Philip was sent to school in Britain, where he was brought up by his mother's British relatives. Andrew went to live in the South of France.

On the French Riviera, Andrew lived in a small apartment, or hotel rooms, or on board a yacht with Countess Andrée de La Bigne. His marriage to Alice was effectively over, and after her recovery and release, she returned to Greece. In 1936, his sentence of exile was quashed by emergency laws, which also restored land and annuities to the King. Andrew returned to Greece for a brief visit that May. The following year, his pregnant daughter Cecilie, his son-in-law and two of his grandchildren were killed in an air accident at Ostend; he met Alice for the first time in six years at the funeral, which was also attended by Andrew's sixteen-year-old son Prince Philip.

During World War II, he found himself essentially trapped in Vichy France, while his son, Prince Philip, fought on the side of the British. They were unable to see or even correspond with one another. Andrew's three surviving sons-in-law fought on the German side: Prince Christoph of Hesse was a member of the Nazi Party and the Waffen-SS; Berthold, Margrave of Baden, was invalided out of the Wehrmacht in 1940 after an injury in France; Prince Gottfried of Hohenlohe-Langenburg served on the Eastern Front and was dismissed after the 20 July plot. For five years, Andrew saw neither his wife nor his son.

Death and burial
He died in the Hotel Metropole, Monte Carlo, Monaco, of heart failure and arteriosclerosis in the closing months of the war in Europe. Andrew was at first buried in the Russian Orthodox church in Nice, but in 1946 his remains were transferred, by the Greek cruiser Averof, to the royal cemetery at Tatoi Palace, near Athens. Prince Philip and then-private secretary, Mike Parker, traveled to Monte Carlo to collect items belonging to his father from Andrée de La Bigne; among these items: a signet ring which the Prince wore from then onwards, an ivory shaving brush he took to using, and some clothes he had adapted to fit him. Prince Andrew left to his only son seven-tenths of his estate, but he also left behind a debt of £17,500, leading Philip's maternal grandmother, Victoria Mountbatten, Marchioness of Milford Haven, to complain bitterly of the extravagance the Greek prince had been led into by his French mistress.

Honours and awards
  Kingdom of Greece: Grand Cross of the Order of the Redeemer
 :
 Knight of the Order of the Elephant, 6 August 1902
 Cross of Honour of the Order of the Dannebrog, 9 November 1902
 Commemorative Medal for the Golden Wedding of King Christian IX and Queen Louise
 King Christian IX Centenary Medal
 : Knight of the Order of the Black Eagle
  Hesse and by Rhine: Knight of the Grand Ducal Hessian Order of the Golden Lion, 7 October 1903
 : Knight of the Supreme Order of the Most Holy Annunciation, 8 April 1907
 : Grand Cross of the Order of Saint-Charles, 14 March 1940
 : Grand Cross of the Royal Norwegian Order of Saint Olav, with Collar, 3 July 1908
 : Knight of the Order of Saint Andrew the Apostle the First-called, 1903
 : Grand Cross of the Royal and Distinguished Order of Charles III, with Collar, 30 May 1906
 : Honorary Knight Grand Cross of the Royal Victorian Order, 22 August 1902 – on the occasion of King Edward VII's coronation

Issue

Ancestry

Notes

References
 Alexandra of Yugoslavia (1959). Prince Philip: A Family Portrait. London: Hodder and Stoughton.
 Brandreth, Gyles (2004). Philip and Elizabeth: Portrait of a Marriage. London: Century. 
 Clogg, Richard (1979). A Short History of Modern Greece. Cambridge: Cambridge University Press. 
 Heald, Tim (1991). The Duke: A Portrait of Prince Philip. London: Hodder and Stoughton. 
 Van der Kiste, John (1994). Kings of the Hellenes. Stroud, Gloucestershire: Alan Sutton Publishing. 
 Vickers, Hugo. (2000). Alice, Princess Andrew of Greece. London: Hamish Hamilton.

Further reading

 Andreas, Prince of Greece; Alice, Princess Andrew of Greece (1930). Towards Disaster: The Greek Army in Asia Minor in 1921 London: John Murray 

Greek princes
Danish princes
House of Glücksburg (Greece)
1882 births
1944 deaths
Burials at Tatoi Palace Royal Cemetery
Hellenic Army generals
Greek military personnel of the Greco-Turkish War (1919–1922)
Greek expatriates in France
Greek people of Russian descent
Recipients of the Cross of Honour of the Order of the Dannebrog
Honorary Knights Grand Cross of the Royal Victorian Order
Grand Crosses of the Order of Saint-Charles
Sons of kings
People from Attica